Marilies Flemming (born 16 December 1933 in Wiener Neustadt, Austria) was an Austrian Member of the European Parliament. In the European Parliament, she used the name Marialiese Flemming. She is a member of the European People's Party (Austrian People's Party domestically) and was first elected during the 1996 European Parliament election for Austria. Her European Parliamentary career ended on 19 July 2004.

Since 1999, Flemming has served on various European Union-related delegations, committees and groups, including the Committee on the Environment, Public Health and Consumer Policy, and sporadically as a substitute on the Committee on Women's Rights (a precursor to the Committee on Women's Rights and Gender Equality which exists today) and the Committee on Research, Technological Development and Energy.

Flemming also held views on human cloning in line with that of the other Christian Democrat Members of the European Parliament. In 2003, she tabled more than 80 amendments in the European Parliament to further restrict cloning research in European Union member states, suggesting the use of adult stem cells for use in research as opposed to embryos. Flemming was reported by The Telegraph as saying that the creation of embryos for the purpose of medical treatment is immoral because the "individual characteristics of a person" are created at the moment of conception.

In 2004, Czech Radio reported that the future European Commissioner for Health & Consumer Protection, Pavel Telička, had been involved in heated debate with Flemming over the issue of the Temelín Nuclear Power Station, a Czech nuclear power station positioned close to the border with nuclear-free Austria. Even though these debates had occurred, Flemming was reported to describe Telicka as "sensational and absolutely perfect".

References 

1933 births
Living people
Austrian People's Party politicians
People from Wiener Neustadt
Austrian People's Party MEPs
MEPs for Austria 1999–2004
MEPs for Austria 1996–1999
20th-century women MEPs for Austria
21st-century women MEPs for Austria